Zero Killed is a 2012 German documentary and crime film directed by Michal Kosakowski and starring Uli Aigner, Aylin Ayaz, Teresa Behr, Dietmar Beinhauer and Dorothée Berghaus.

Cast
In alphabetical order
 Uli Aigner
 Aylin Ayaz
 Teresa Behr
 Dietmar Beinhauer
 Dorothée Berghaus
 Max Boehme
 Barbara Braun
 David Bruckner
 Michele Cavaliere
 Therese Davies

References

External links
 
 

2010s German-language films
Polish-language films
2010s English-language films
2012 films
2012 documentary films
2012 crime films
2012 multilingual films
Austrian multilingual films
German multilingual films